Francis Beattie (29 August 1829 – 16 April 1886) was a hatter and member of the Queensland Legislative Assembly.

Biography
Beattie was born in Dumfries, Scotland to parents Francis Beattie and his wife Susannah (née Hannah). He attended school in Carlisle, Cumberland and became a sailor as a boy. In 1849, whilst in a new Zealand port, there was a disturbance amongst the crew and the captain of the ship refused to proceed but Beattie took charge and navigated the vessel to Port Phillip where he gained work as a pilot. During the Canoona gold rush he sailed to Keppel Bay and later visited Brisbane. He finally settled in Brisbane in 1862, arriving on the Maryborough.

In 1850 he married Janet Ross (died 1887) in Brisbane, and together had five sons and five daughters. A member of the Grand United Order of Oddfellows, he died  April 1886. His funeral proceeded from his Bowen Hills residence to the Toowong Cemetery.

Political career
Beattie was an alderman in the Brisbane Municipal Council from 1868 until 1871 and then 1873 until 1874. He was appointed Chairman of the Booroodabin Divisional Board and President of the Joint Board of the United Municipality. He was also superintendent of the Brisbane fire brigade from 1870 until 1882.

He was also the member for Fortitude Valley in the Queensland Parliament from 1874 until his 1878 and 1879 until his death in 1886.

References

Members of the Queensland Legislative Assembly
1829 births
1886 deaths
Burials at Toowong Cemetery
19th-century Australian politicians